Wheel is an unincorporated community located in Graves County, Kentucky, United States.

Notable people
Alben W. Barkley, Vice-President of the United States (1949–1953).

References

Unincorporated communities in Graves County, Kentucky
Unincorporated communities in Kentucky